The , also known as , is the national team representing Japan in international baseball competitions. It won the World Baseball Classic in 2006 and 2009, as well as WBSC Premier12 in 2019. The team is currently ranked 1st in the world by the World Baseball Softball Confederation.

The team has participated in every Summer Olympic Games since the first demonstration tournament in 1984, through when baseball was discontinued following the 2008 Beijing Games. Until 2000, the team was made up exclusively of amateur players. Since the 2000 Summer Olympics, the team has been composed of players from Nippon Professional Baseball. The team that played in the 2006 World Baseball Classic included Japanese players from Major League Baseball as well.

The team won the 2006 Classic. It played at the Beijing Olympics in 2008, as it had qualified through the Asian Baseball Championship in 2007. Unlike the WBC roster, the Olympic team was composed exclusively of NPB players (though it included one amateur player, who was drafted during the tournament's progress). Japan participated in the 2017 World Baseball Classic, finishing third.

Team Japan won the 2019 WBSC Premier12 Tournament. At the Olympics in 2021 it faced Israel, Mexico, South Korea, the United States, and the Dominican Republic.

Current roster
Source:

Nickname
The team has been nicknamed . Like other national teams in Japan, the nickname is usually prefixed with the surname of the manager. However, in the 2009 World Baseball Classic, the team used Samurai, a symbol of Japan's history, instead of Hara, the surname of their manager. In 2012, it was adopted officially.

Results and fixtures
The following is a list of professional baseball match results currently active in the latest version of the WBSC World Rankings, as well as any future matches that have been scheduled.

Legend

2019

2021

2022

2023

Regional competition

Asian Baseball Championship

Japan have dominated the Asian Baseball Championship since its inception, and have competed in every year. Japan have never missed out on placing in the top 3 in any tournament, and is the only team to have achieved this feat. Japan also holds the record for most consecutive Asian Championships, having won four times in a row on two occasions.

Asian Games

In all four Asian Games to include baseball, Japan have placed in the top 3 in every tournament, though they have only won the tournament once in the first event held in Hiroshima in 1994.

International competition

World Baseball Classic

2006
Japan won the inaugural 2006 World Baseball Classic, defeating Cuba in the Final.

2006 WBC roster

2009
Japan also won the 2009 World Baseball Classic, hosting the Pool A games in the Tokyo Dome.  Japan started the tournament opener with a 4–0 win over China.  Japan then secured advancement into the second round with a 14–2 win in seven innings over rival South Korea.  The game was shortened due to the WBC's mercy rule.  Japan then played South Korea again to determine seeding for the second round.  In the rematch, the Koreans shut out Japan 1–0, making Japan advance as the Pool A runner-up. In Pool 1 of the WBC quarter-finals, Japan defeated Cuba 6–0, but lost to Korea again 4–1. In the elimination match that followed, Japan secured a spot in the semi-finals with a 5–0 win over Cuba. Japan defeated South Korea in the Finals 5–3 partly because of an Ichiro Suzuki base hit in the 10th inning.

2009 WBC roster

2013: The end of the championship streak
Japan, the two-time world defending champions, entered the 2013 World Baseball Classic, hosting Pool A games in the Fukuoka Dome, facing off against Cuba, China, and newcomers Brazil. Despite their first loss against the Cuban team, they secured their position for the second round in 2013 World Baseball Classic Pool 1 to face off the Netherlands and Chinese Taipei. The Japanese team narrowly won against Chinese Taipei 4-3, before proceeding to face off against the Dutch team, winning against them twice before proceeding to the semi-final round, along with the Netherlands, as they faced off against Puerto Rico. Despite Japan's efforts, they eventually lost 3-1 against the Puerto Rican team right after Alex Ríos scored two additional runs from a home run. Japan finished third in the 2013 WBC, as their two-time championship streak ended. The Japanese team bowed out to both the crowd and the Puerto Rican team as a gesture of respect.

2013 WBC roster

2017
In the 2017 World Baseball Classic, Japan hosted Pool B games in the Tokyo Dome. They finished first round play with a 3-0 record and advanced to the second round.  After batting .364, outfielder Yoshitomo Tsutsugoh was named the Pool B MVP. In the second round, Japan hosted Pool E games in the Tokyo Dome and again finished pool play with a 3-0 record, advancing to the championship round. However, Japan lost to the United States 2-1 in the semifinal. They finished the tournament in third place. Pitcher Kodai Senga was named to the All-World Baseball Classic Team.

2017 WBC roster

Olympic Games

2008

2008 Summer Olympics roster

2021
Baseball is being featured at the 2020 Summer Olympics, in Tokyo, for the first time since the 2008 Summer Olympics. Six national teams are competing in the tournament:  Israel,  Japan (host), Mexico, South Korea, the United States, and the Dominican Republic. It will be held from July 28 to August 7, 2021.

2020 Summer Olympics roster

Baseball World Cup

Intercontinental Cup

Premier12 Tournament

2015
Team Japan came in third in the 2015 WBSC Premier12 Tournament.

2019
Team Japan won the 12-team 2019 WBSC Premier12 Tournament, which was held from November 2 to 17, 2019.

International tournament results

World Baseball Classic

Olympic Games

Baseball World Cup

Intercontinental Cup

Asian Baseball Championship

See also
 Sports in Japan
 Baseball in Japan
 Japan national under-18 baseball team
 Japan women's national baseball team

References

External links

 Official website 
 野球日本代表 侍ジャパンオフィシャルサイト 
 
 
 

 
 
National baseball teams in Asia